Gard is a global operator within marine insurance and is the largest Protection & Indemnity insurer among the thirteen members of the International Group of P&I Clubs. The company ranks second in the marine insurance industry behind Allianz. Its clients include shipowners and operators, shipyards, and companies involved in the upstream oil and gas markets, as well as windfarm operators.
The group employs more than 550+ people in 13 offices in Arendal, Athens, Bergen, Bermuda, Helsinki, Hong Kong, Imabari, London, New York, Oslo, Singapore, Rio de Janeiro, and Tokyo.

History 
Assuranceforeningen Gard, the P&I Club, was founded in Arendal, Norway in 1907. The establishment of this new marine mutual reflected the historical importance of Arendal as a shipping centre at that time, but it was also driven by the reluctance of owners of sailing ships to subsidise the liabilities arising from owners operating steam ships. Although Gard's P&I business started in 1907, its marine insurance activities can be traced back to as far as 1867 with the establishment of Æolus, which later became part of the Storebrand group.

Over time, the importance of Arendal as a major Norwegian shipping-hub waned. The Second World War also took a heavy toll on owners insured with Gard. As a result, by 1945, the Gard's membership had shrunk considerably.
In the post-war period, Gard slowly regained its position as a major P&I Club. Two factors played an important part in this development, the growth of the Norwegian national fleet between 1950 and 1970, and the increasingly international nature of Gard's P&I membership. While Gard today retains its Norwegian identity, it has become a global P&I club, where less than 14% of the current entered tonnage is domiciled in Norway. 

Gard purchased the If's marine and energy book in October 2003.

Business 
The group's business focuses on P&I and hull covers for shipowners, operators and charterers; marine builders' risks, the oil and gas markets, defence and small craft.

Shipowners, operators and charterers
Gard provides liability, property, and income insurances to shipowners and operators, including tailor-made covers to suit individual operators, as well as many non-standard P&I shipping covers.

Liability insurance, known as P&I insurance, protects the shipowner against third-party liabilities and expenses arising from the ownership and operation of ships. The insurance is provided through a mutual structure which means that the buyers of the insurance are effectively the insurer. 

One of the particularities of the P&I clubs, is that they participate in a claims sharing and collective reinsurance purchasing arrangement through the International Group of P&I Clubs. The reinsurance programme is the largest in the world. The arrangement, due to its size and structure, enables the clubs to significantly reduce their need for risk capital in a cost-effective way. The aim is for these cost savings to be reflected in the premium levels shipowners pay for their P&I cover over time. 

Property insurance covers the assured against losses that may occur to the vessel and her equipment as a result of an accident, while income insurance protects against losses where the ship is wholly or partially deprived of income as a result of it being out of operation. These insurances are provided by Gard on a commercial basis rather than through the mutual organisation. The earnings from this business are therefore retained for the benefit of the mutual members (the buyers of mutual P&I cover).

Marine builders risk 
Gard also provides cover for the shipbuilding industry for the risks involving in building ships (from “keel laying” to delivery) and for projects where a ship is converted from one type of use to another. This includes covers such as towage, delay in delivery and non-delivery. There is also mortgage covers for banks and financial institutions which protect the policyholder against the perils of non-payment of outstanding loans and interests in “sailing” ships, i.e., they are not linked to ships being built.

Oil and gas markets 
Gard provides insurance for companies in the upstream oil and gas industry, including large oil producers, as well as contractors operating mobile offshore drilling units, such as offshore accommodation units and FPSOs. The covers range from traditional property and casualty to liability insurances. The company has also entered the renewables market with insurance for offshore wind power projects.

Small craft 
Insurance covers for operators and owners of small crafts such as passenger and local ferries, fishing vessels, tugs, dredgers, coastal cargo carriers, pushers, pontoons, barges and more.

Defence 
Insurance against legal and other costs incurred in establishing and defending claims from business operations.

References

P&I clubs
Cooperatives in Norway
Companies based in Agder
Insurance companies of Norway
Financial services companies established in 1907
1907 establishments in Norway